Love Fungus was an English indie rock band from Birmingham, that featured on series two of the BBC TV series, James May's Man Lab. As part of the programme, which first aired in the UK on 1 November 2011, the band reunited after 20 years apart, auditioning and winning the chance to perform at the High Voltage Festival in July 2011.

History 
The band had originally formed in 1991, but broke up later that year. They reunited to audition for James May's Man Lab after Ian Kelly had sent an email putting their band forward. After playing at the High Voltage Festival, the band recorded their first EP, Blind Devotion. In 2012 they released their debut single "Vampire Movies".

In December 2015, Ian Kelly announced through the band's Facebook page that Love Fungus had ceased activities indefinitely.

Discography

Blind Devotion (EP)
Blind Devotion is the debut EP from Love Fungus and was released on 7 October 2011.

Personnel
Love Fungus
Mat McIvor – vocals
Ian Kelly – drums
Mark Rabone – guitar
Ben Upton – bass guitar
Dennis Day – guitar

Additional musicians
Ross Taylor – percussion (2, 4)

Production
Love Funguss – producer
Jon Dewsbury – recording engineering
Recorded at Rich Bitch Studios, Birmingham, England

Artwork
Matt McIvor (hardworkwiththekids.blogspot.com)

Vampire Movies (Single)
"Vampire Movies" is the debut single from Love Fungus and was released on 9 January 2012.

References

External links 
 Official Facebook

English rock music groups
Musical groups from Birmingham, West Midlands